Viuz-en-Sallaz is a commune in the Haute-Savoie department and Auvergne-Rhône-Alpes region of eastern France, close to the Swiss border.

It was historically a possession of the noble house of de Faucigny and then passed to Ardutius de Faucigny, Bishop of Geneva and successive prince-bishops. It stayed in the possession of the church until the French Revolution. There is a statue of St Francis de Sales, then Bishop of Geneva, in Viuz.

See also
Communes of the Haute-Savoie department

References

Communes of Haute-Savoie